Boitano is a surname. Notable people with the surname include:

Brian Boitano (born 1963), American figure skater
Dan Boitano (born 1953), American baseball player
Mark Boitano (born 1953), American politician and real estate agent
Mary Etta Boitano (born 1963), American marathon runner